Movie Park Germany is a theme park in Bottrop-Kirchhellen in western Germany,  north of Düsseldorf, with an area of . It consists of 7 areas based on movies and TV series. Nearby the park are several film studios.

History
The park originally opened under the name "Kirchhellener Märchenwald" in 1967. Märchenpark was run by the West German family Allekötter. The park featured attractions consisting of huts in the woods where guests could press buttons to listen to different fairy tales.

A couple named Hans and Ida Rosenberg bought the park after the 1976 season. They operated the park under the name "Traumlandpark". This became their second park, the first being the Tuddern safari park in Tüddern, West Germany which they purchased from Mr. Löffelhardt and Mr. Schmidt, who sold the park so they could focus on their newest project, Phantasialand. In 1985, the Rosenbergs ran out of money and had to declare bankruptcy with the debt of €22 million.

Wolf-Dieter Jahn from Essen, West Germany and Alexandre Berthé from France, who had previously worked at the park, bought it in 1986 and reopened it in 1987 under the name "Neue Traumland". In 1989 they decided to sell the park to Bavaria Film, and it closed again on 31 August 1991.

The park opened on 6 June 1992 under the name "Bavaria Filmpark". This park was originally scheduled to open in May 1991. The park closed in 1993 after not becoming very popular.

In May 1994, Warner Bros. purchased the location, and began construction on "Warner Bros. Movie World Germany". The park had a grand opening on 29 June 1996 with 20,000 invited guests including Johannes Rau, Ernst Löchelt, August Everding, Gustava Everding, Michael Douglas, Sophia Loren, Ron Williams, Amanda Lear, David Copperfield, Claudia Schiffer, Arnold Schwarzenegger, George Clooney, Chris O’Donnell, Alicia Silverstone, Joel Schumacher, Hans Meiser and Heinz Hoenig as special guests. The park opened to the general public on 30 June 1996. Zeitgeist Design and Production's Ryan Harmon served as the Director of Show Development for Warner Bros. International Recreation Enterprises, where he conceived, wrote and managed the design team for Warner Bros. Movie World in Germany's worth of rides, shows and attractions. Botticelli's - Atelier der angewandten Malerei and Sanderson Group were responsible for designing and painting the theming for the park. Alan Griffith Architect and Alder Constructions were also involved in the park's development.

At the end of 1999, Warner Bros. sold the park to Premier Parks (now Six Flags). Premier Parks continued to license the Warner Bros. Movie World name.

In later years, large investments in bigger, faster, more action-packed attractions made Warner Bros. Movie World Germany no longer a crowd puller for families, but rather in the direction of teenagers and the young at heart. Families stayed away from the park, and many thrillseekers visited it. This, along with a decline in visitor numbers, resulted in Warner Bros. Movie World Germany being acquired by StarParks, a subsidiary of Palamon Capital Partners, on 3 April 2004, which led to the park reopening as "Movie Park Germany" on 19 March 2005, and having a grand opening on 24 March 2005, with the Warner Bros. theming removed from the park and replaced by newer themes from 20th Century Fox, MGM, and Nickelodeon.

In August 2006, the two-lane roller coaster Cop Car Chase (previously Lethal Weapon Pursuit) was shut down and dismantled, as a repair would have been too expensive from an economic point of view. The vacated space was used for the new Santa Monica Pier themed area, which opened in May 2007. The area based on the Californian Santa Monica Pier also uses part of the area of the also partially dismantled, partially redesigned Downtown area (previously Marienhof). The main attraction of the area is Germany's first stationary Disk’O Coaster.

In addition, the Wonderland Studios (kids' area) was expanded with the Nickland by 15,000 m² for the 2007 season. The themed area, built in collaboration with the German television station Nick, deals exclusively with the station's characters and themed worlds. Attractions include a Suspended Family Coaster (Jimmy Neutron’s Atomic Flyer) and a water attraction (Spongebob Splash Bash). In addition, the 2007 season brought a change of motto, instead of "A day like in the film" it is now "Hurray! I'm in the film" (until 2004 the slogan was " Hollywood in Germany "). With the opening of Nickland, old attractions such as Dishwasher were re-themed.

Since 2007 the sidewalks of the park have been paved. The entire Nickland, Main Street and Vine Street are now paved.

For the 2008 season, the kids' area Wonderland Studios was integrated into Nickland. For this purpose, old children's attractions have been relocated or demolished and other attractions have been redesigned. In addition, a wild water course was built on the site of the go-kart track; the latter was demolished. Another new attraction is an carousel of the model Aviator. The new area opened in May 2008. In the Roxy 4D cinema, a film about SpongeBob SquarePants was replaced by Shrek, which again was replaced for the 2012 season by Ice Age. To this end, the Roxy 4D cinema was redesigned and a new preshow was installed.

On 17 May 2010, Parques Reunidos bought the park from Palamon Capital Partners. No changes to the park's name or theming occurred.

For the park's 15th birthday, on June 18, 2011, the combination of roller coaster and dark ride Van Helsing’s Factory was opened in the hall that formerly housed the Gremlins invasion and had only been used for Halloween since 2005. The roller coaster was built by the Gerstlauer company, the theme is based freely on the character of the vampire hunter Van Helsing from the 2004 film of the same name. According to the park, the roller coaster and the show "Shadows of Darkness", which uses the character of Van Helsing, are attractions that do not require a license. In addition to "Shadows of Darkness", which replaced the X-Men Show (ran in 2010 and 2011 in Studio 7), three more shows were revised for 2012.

The novelty for 2017 was announced for the 20th anniversary of the park. It is a new roller coaster from Mack Rides and is called: Star Trek: Operation Enterprise. The track is located in a completely new themed area that is devoted to Star Trek. The themed area takes up the last parts of the former Marienhof, the former film museum and the unused space between the "Alien Encounter" and "The Lost Temple". The 40-meter-high launch coaster is the second tallest structure in the park and replaces the plans for the "Air Driver" roller coaster that were rejected in 2012. The following year it was announced that the Mystery River - one of the most popular and oldest attractions in the park - will be subject to a complete thematic redesign. The main changes are the waiting area, the theming and the effects during the journey. The ride will also receive a new soundtrack from IMAscore. The course of the journey itself remains largely unchanged. In 2019, the theming of Bermuda Triangle - Alien Encounter was slightly changed, the ride was renamed and a new soundtrack from IMAscore was included.

In the building of the former dark ride Ice Age Adventure, a new roller coaster with the name Movie Park Studio Tour was built. On 23 June 2021, this new attraction had its opening to celebrate the 25th birthday of the park.

Areas
The park is divided up into 7 areas each with their own collection of attractions.

The Hollywood Street Set
Area 51 - Top Secret – Intamin spillwater (formerly Bermuda Triangle: Alien Encounter (19 March 2005-2018), Das Bermuda Dreieck (30 June 1996 – 31 October 2004)). It is a replica of the previously operated Sea World ride in Australia.
Looney Tunes 4D - Roadrunner & Wile e Coyote  - A 4-D film shown at the Roxy 4D-Kino.
The Lost Temple - Simworx Immersive Tunnel (replaced Movie Magic - Voyagers to Mars (19 March 2005-2010), Movie Magic Special Effects Stage (1996-2004))

Streets of New York
(formerly Gotham City)
NYC Transformer - Huss Top Spin (replaced Riddler's Revenge (1999-2004))
Taste of New York - An expansive food court featuring regional specialties, including Jack's Deli and NY Pizza & Pasta.
Time Riders – Time-travel with John Cleese - Attraction Media & Entertainment Inc. simulators (replaced Batman Abenteuer - The Ride  (1996-2004))
Van Helsing's Factory - Gerstlauer Bobsled roller coaster (replaced Gremlin Invasion (1996-2004))
Former attractions:
Cartoon Theatre - movie theatre (1996-2002)

Nickland
(formerly Wonderland Studios (2005-2006), Looney Tunes Land (1996-2004))
 Avatar Air Glider - Zamperla Giant Skychaser themed to Avatar: The Last Airbender
 The Backyardigans: Mission to Mars - Vekoma Family Roller Coaster themed to The Backyardigans (replaced Rocket Rider Rollercoaster (2005-2007), Roadrunner Achterbahn (1996-2004))
 Barnyard Bumpers - Preston & Barbieri Bumper Cars themed to Back at the Barnyard (replaced Ram Jam (2005-2007), Marc Antony's Autoscooter (1996-2004))
 Dora's Big River Adventure - Zamperla Log Flume themed to Dora the Explorer
 Fairy World Spin - Mack Rides Teacups ride themed to The Fairly OddParents (replaced Danny Phantom Ghost Zone (2007-2012), Dishwasher (2005-2006), Looney Tunes Tea Party (1999-2004))
 Ghost Chasers - Mack Rides Wild Mouse rollercoaster themed to SpongeBob SquarePants (replaced Mad Manor (2005-2007), Tom and Jerry - Mouse in the House (1996-2004))
 Jimmy Neutron's Atomic Flyer - Vekoma Suspended Family Coaster themed to Jimmy Neutron
 Sea Swing - SBF Swing ride themed to SpongeBob SquarePants
 Splat-O-Sphere - Chance Rides Aviator
 SpongeBob Splash Bash - Preston & Barbieri Splash Battle ride themed to SpongeBob SquarePants
 Teenage Mutant Ninja Turtles: License to Drive- Driving attraction themed to Nickelodeon's Teenage Mutant Ninja Turtles series
 PAW Patrol Adventure Bay (Sub-area, opened in 2019)
- Zuma’s Zoomer - Zamperla Speedway (-2018 Swiper's Sweeper) 
- PAW Patrol Adventure Tour - Zamperla Convoy
- Zuma and Rubble theme - Children's Playground
- Skye’s High Flyer - Zamperla Kiddie carpet (replaced Team Umizoomi Number Tumbler (2012 -2019), Teenage Robot Turnabout (2007-2012), Flying Cloud (2005-2006), The Daffy Duck Thundercloud (1996-2004))
Former attractions:
Adventure Express - Zamperla Kiddie Train (2008-2012; replaced Dora's Adventure Express (2007), Wonderland Studios Steam Tour (2005-2006), Yosemite Sam Rail Road (1996-2004))
Beetle Dance - Zamperla Turtle Parade (2005-2007; replaced Porky Pig Parade (1996-2004))
 Blue's Skidoo - SBF Jet ride (-2018) - Themed to Blue's Clues.
Brandy Bird's Hat Dance - Mini Jet (2005-2007; replaced Tweety und Sylvester Jr. Chase (1996-2004))
 Diego's Rescue Rider (-2018) - Zamperla Jump Around themed to Go, Diego Go!
Max Mouse Moto - Motorcycle Jump (2005-2007; replaced Taz 500 (1996-2004))
Movie Crew Carousel (2005-2006; replaced Looney Tunes Carousel (2000-2004))
Nick Speed Racers - Go-kart track (2007; replaced Mister Valentino's Go Kart Races (2005-2006), Speedy Gonzales Go Cart Races (2003-2004), Speedy Gonzales Taxi (1996-2002))
Robert's Rat Race - Farm Tractor (2005-2007; replaced Elmer Fudd's Tractor Race (1996-2004))
 Wonder Pets Flyboat - SBF Kiddie Freefall Tower themed to Wonder Pets (2008-2018 replaced The Backyardigans Hip Hopper (2007), Maple Hopper (2006), Miss Patricia's Treehouse (2005), Tweety's Treehouse (2001-2004))

The Old West
Bandit – Germany's first modern wooden roller coaster(Based on the Coney Island roller coaster The Cyclone)
Lucky Luke – The Ride: Die Daltons brechen aus (summer 2020) – Vekoma Suspended Looping Coaster - former MP Express
Side Kick - Huss Frisbee (replaced Blazing Saddles (2000-31 October 2004))
The High Fall - Intamin Tilting Gyro Drop. A clone of Acrophobia at Six Flags Over Georgia (replaced The Wild Bunch (6 April 2002 – 31 October 2004)).
 new interactive laser walkthrough in Studio 7 (ghost hunting theme) - opening within season 2020
Former attractions:
Josie's Bath House - Huss Breakdance 4 (2000-2007; dismantled in 2008)
The Walking Dead: Breakout - all year-maze, featuring authentic sets from the TV-Show.

Santa Monica Pier
Crazy Surfer - Zamperla Disk-O Coaster
Pier Patrol - Zierer Wild Water Rondell
Pier Side Carousel - Zierer Wave Swinger
Rescue 112 - Zamperla Fire Brigade
Santa Monica Wheel - SBF Ferris Wheel
Stormy Cruise - Zamperla Rockin' Tug

Former attractions:
Cop Car Chase - Intamin dueling roller coaster (2005-2006; replaced Lethal Weapon Pursuit (1996-2004)))
The Walking Dead: Breakout - all year-maze, featuring authentic sets from the TV-Show.

Adventure Lagoon 
(formerly part of Looney Tunes Land (1996-2004))
 Excalibur - Secrets of the Dark Forest  - Intamin rapid ride (replaced Mystery River (2005-2017), Unendliche Geschichte (1996-2004))
  Movie Park Studio Tour - Multi Dimension Coaster - Intamin (replaced Ice Age Adventure (2005-2016), Looney Tunes Adventure (1996-2004))

Federation Plaza 
(formerly Downtown (2005-2006), Marienhof (1996-2004))
Star Trek: Operation Enterprise - Mack Rides Launch Coaster - triple launch, first twisted halfpipe in Europe.

Attractions

Roller coasters

Water rides

Other

Shows
Movie Park Germany features many live shows as well as a 4-D movie.
Nicktoons Character Show - Let's Party with the Nicktoons
Meet the Moviecals Show - live show (2005-2007; replaced Bugs 'n Friends Rock'n Roll Party (2002-2004), Bugs 'n Friends Music Party (1996-2001))
Crazy Cops New York - Action Stunt Show - a live action stunt show (replaced Crazy Cops - Action Stunt Show (2013-2016), Crazy Action Stunt Show (2005-2013), Police Academy Stunt Show (1996-2004))
Meet the Stunt Crew 
Meet the TMNT (Teenage Mutant Ninja Turtles)
Street Entertainment in several areas of the park (e.g. Western Stunt Show, Character meeting, Marilyn Monroe impersonator)

Halloween Horror Fest
The Halloween Horror Fest is an annual event around Halloween time that began in October 1999. It features over 250 scare actors and extra attractions like mazes and scarezones, as well as shows.

Maze :

Fear Forest (12+) (2021 to...)
Hell House (16+) (2022 to...)
Projet Ningyo (16+) (2019 to...)
Circus Of Freaks New version (16+) (2021 to...)
The Slaughterhouse (16+) (2015 to ...)
St Elmo UPGRADE(16+) (2022 to...)
Hostel (18+) (2017 to...)
Chupacabra (16+) (2020 to...)

Former mazes (1999-2021)

St Elmo (16+) (2020 to 2021)
Acid Warrior (16+) (2021 to 2021)
Circus Of Freaks reloaded (16+) (2020 to 2020)
Insidious 2 (16+) (2016 to 2020)
Campout (12+) (2016 to 2020)
Deathpital Reloaded (16+) (2014 to 2018)
 The Walking Dead Breakout (Operates the whole season, 16+)
Wrong Turn (16+) (2018 to 2019)
Terror Train (housed in the Gremlin Invasion show building from 2002 to 2007)
House of Horror (housed in the Cartoon Theatre show building from 2002 to 2008)
The Dark Goldmine (housed in the Gremlin Invasion show building from 2008 to 2010)
Infected (Former: The Walking Dead, based on the TV show The Walking Dead, 16+)
Baboo Twister Club (12+)
The Forgotten (16+) (housed in the Cartoon Theatre show building from 2011 to 2014)
Noxam Nocere (housed in the Cartoon Theatre show building from 2008 to 2009)
City Of The Damned
Deathpital
Panic Zone
Paranormal Activity 2 (based on the 2010 motion picture; housed in the Cartoon Theatre show building in 2010)
Knott's haunted Mountain (water ride with live scare actors. The attraction, now known as 'Bermuda Triangle: Alien Encounter', operates the whole season, but without scare actors)

During the HHF the Nickland theme area is a 'Monsterfreie Zone' (engl. 'monster free area') where children can stay at the park without being scared of the scare actors.

References

External links

 
 

 
Amusement parks in Germany
Bottrop
1996 establishments in Germany
Tourist attractions in North Rhine-Westphalia
Parques Reunidos
Amusement parks opened in 1996
Former Warner Bros. Global Brands and Experiences attractions